Uzbekistan Super League, also called Coca-Cola Uzbekistan Super League due to sponsorship reasons, is the top division of professional football in Uzbekistan. It is operated under the auspices of the Uzbekistan Professional Football League and Uzbekistan Football Association. It was founded in 1992 and currently played with 14 teams. The top team qualifies to the group stage of the AFC Champions League.

History 
The Uzbek League was founded in 1992 after the collapse of the Soviet Union and its domestic league, the Soviet Top League. The league is known locally as the Higher League with relegation to the First League.

League system 
The league is generally played between March to November in the calendar year and has occasionally had the Super Cup as a curtain raiser to the domestic campaign. Teams play each other on a home and away basis. Two or three teams can be relegated depending on the number of sides participating which has in the past been between 17 and 14 sides. Occasionally no sides would be promoted from the First League, due to reserve teams winning the championships. Reserve clubs are not allowed to feature in the top flight but can play at any level up to First League. On these occasions, clubs can be relegated without any promoted sides making the next campaign feature less sides than before.

League winners enter the next edition of the AFC Champions League along with the winners of the Uzbekistan Cup.

On 21 November 2017 according to the UzPFL management decision the Uzbek League was officially renamed to Uzbekistan Super League starting from 2018 season. The number of teams playing in top division of Uzbek football is reduced from 16 to 12.

Champions

Soviet time champions 

Championship of cities of Uzbek SSR
 1926: Tashkent City Team
 1927: Tashkent City Team
 1928: Ferghana City Team
 1929: Tashkent City Team
 1930: Tashkent City Team
 1931–32 : No championship
 1933: Tashkent City Team
 1934: Tashkent City Team
 1935: Tashkent City Team
 1936: Tashkent City Team
Republican League Competitions
 1937: Spartak Tashkent
 1938: Spartak Tashkent
 1939: Dinamo Tashkent
 1940–47 : no championship
 1948: Polyarnaya Zvezda Tashkent Oblast
 1949: Dinamo Tashkent
 1950: Spartak Tashkent
 1951: Spartak Tashkent
 1952: Dinamo Tashkent
 1953: FShM Tashkent
 1954: Dinamo Tashkent
 1955: ODO Tashkent (later SKA)
 1956: ODO Tashkent
 1957: Mashstroi Tashkent
 1958: Khimik Chirchik
 1959: Mekhnat Tashkent
 1960: Sokol Tashkent
 1961: Sokol Tashkent
 1962: Sokol Tashkent
 1963: Sokol Tashkent
 1964: Sokol Tashkent
 1965: Sokol Tashkent
 1966: Zvezda Tashkent
 1967: Tashavtomash Tashkent
 1968: Chust Namangan Oblast
 1969: Tashkabel Tashkent
 1970: SKA Tashkent (former ODO)
 1971: Yangiaryk Khorezm Oblast
 1972: Trud Jizzakh
 1973: Quruvchi Samarqand
 1974: Pakhtakor Gulistan
 1975: Zarafshan Navoi
 1976: Traktor Tashkent
 1977: Khiva
 1978: Khorezm (Kolkhoz im. Narimanova)
 1979: Khisar Shakhrisabz
 1980: No championship
 1981: Ekipress Samarqand
 1982: Beshkent
 1983: Tselinnik Turtkul
 1984: Khorezm Khonqa
 1985: Shakhter Angren
 1986: Traktor Tashkent
 1987: Avtomobilist Fergana
 1988: Selmashevets Chirchik
 1989: Nurafshon Bukhara
 1990: Naryn Khakulabad
 1991: Politotdel Tashkent Oblast (now Do'stlik)

Since independence 

 1992: Neftchi Farg'ona and Pakhtakor Tashkent
 1993: Neftchi Farg'ona
 1994: Neftchi Farg'ona
 1995: Neftchi Farg'ona
 1996: Navbahor Namangan
 1997: MHSK Tashkent (former Pakhtakor-79 Tashkent)
 1998: Pakhtakor Tashkent
 1999: Do'stlik (former Politotdel Tashkent Oblast)
 2000: Do'stlik
 2001: Neftchi Farg'ona
 2002: Pakhtakor Tashkent
 2003: Pakhtakor Tashkent
 2004: Pakhtakor Tashkent
 2005: Pakhtakor Tashkent
 2006: Pakhtakor Tashkent
 2007: Pakhtakor Tashkent
 2008: Bunyodkor Tashkent
 2009: Bunyodkor Tashkent
 2010: Bunyodkor Tashkent
 2011: Bunyodkor Tashkent
 2012: Pakhtakor Tashkent
 2013: Bunyodkor Tashkent
 2014: Pakhtakor Tashkent
 2015: Pakhtakor Tashkent
 2016: Lokomotiv Tashkent
 2017: Lokomotiv Tashkent
 2018: Lokomotiv Tashkent
 2019: Pakhtakor Tashkent
 2020: Pakhtakor Tashkent
 2021: Pakhtakor Tashkent
 2022: Pakhtakor Tashkent

Champions and top scorers

Performance by club 

* Both teams were awarded with the title.

All-time table 
All-time table of league, as of end of the 2022 season

Soviet Top League participation

Players records

Top scorers

Most appearances

Sponsorship 
From 1992 to 2017, the Uzbekistan Super League had no title sponsorship rights with any companies. Only starting from 2018 Uzbekistan Super League have got title League sponsor. On 4 April 2018 Uzbekistan Football Association vice-president Umid Akhmadjonov and IBT, the official PepsiCo bottler, reached agreement that PepsiCo became official League sponsor for 2018 season.

See also 
 List of foreign football players in Uzbekistan
 Uzbekistan Pro League
 Uzbekistan Pro-B League
 Uzbekistan Second League
 Uzbekistan Cup
 Uzbekistan League Cup

References

External links 
 Official Website of Uzbek Professional League
 soccerway.com; standings, results & fixtures
 Weltfussballarchiv; standings, results & fixtures & club profiles
 RSSSF.com – Uzbekistan – List of Champions
 footballfetch.com – results, fixtures, tables, bet stats

1992 establishments in Uzbekistan
1
Uzbekistan
Sports leagues established in 1992